Mahmudabad (also Romanized as Maḩmūdābād) is a village in Chahdegal Rural District, Negin Kavir District, Fahraj County, Kerman Province, Iran. At the 2006 census, its population was 76, in 16 families.

References 

Populated places in Fahraj County